Richard J. Condon (born 1935/1936) was the New York City Police Commissioner from October 23, 1989 to January 22, 1990.

Condon later served as New York City's Head of School Investigations, before retiring in late 2017.

References

New York City Police Commissioners
Living people
Year of birth missing (living people)